Joseph Fleming (6 January 1811 – 23 September 1891) was a politician in Queensland, Australia. He was a Member of the Queensland Legislative Assembly.

Politics
On 22 June 1860, William Nelson, one of the three members for West Moreton, was unseated by petition. Joseph Fleming was elected to the Queensland Legislative Assembly in the resulting by-election on 9 July 1860. Fleming held the seat until he resigned on 3 November 1862 when he became bankrupt. Joshua Peter Bell won the resulting by-election on 15 December 1862.

On 7 August 1866, the Premier of Queensland and member for West Moreton, Robert Herbert, resigned. Joseph Fleming won the resulting by-election on 11 September 1866. He held the seat until 2 July 1867 (the 1867 election) when he was defeated by Joshua Peter Bell (sitting member), Patrick O'Sullivan and George Thorn.

In 2017 a crypt in an unmarked section of Ipswich General Cemetery was found to contain the remains of Fleming and his wife Phoebe.  The crypt was located in the 1990s and sealed over at the time to prevent vandalism. In October 2018 the crypt was excavated by archaeologists and students from the University of Southern Queensland. The remains of Fleming, and his wife and daughter, are scheduled to be re-interred in July 2019.

See also
 Members of the Queensland Legislative Assembly, 1860–1863; 1863-1867

References

Members of the Queensland Legislative Assembly
1811 births
1891 deaths
19th-century Australian politicians